Margaret Crosland is a Canadian former figure skater from Calgary, Alberta. She is the 1958 and 1959 Canadian national champion. She started skating at age 7, and was coached by the Swiss Olympian Hans Gerschwiler. She represented the Glencoe Club as a junior and the Winnipeg Winter Club as a senior.

Crosland graduated from the University of British Columbia. Now known as Margaret (Margie) Birdsell, she has enjoyed a 50 year tenure as a figure skating judge and international figure skating referee.  She judged 5 world figure skating championships and the 1984 Winter Olympics in Sarajevo. She is recognized for helping Canadian skaters through encouragement and supporting the sport through fair judging.  In 1978 she was awarded the Alberta Government Achievement Award as an outstanding Albertan. She was inducted into the Alberta Sports Hall of Fame in 1983.

Now known as Margaret Crosland Berezowski, she was featured in a segment profiling Alberta Sports Hall of Fame inductees, where she reflected on her experience.

Results

References

Navigation

Living people
Alberta Sports Hall of Fame inductees
Canadian female single skaters
University of British Columbia alumni
Year of birth missing (living people)